Official Version is the third studio album by Front 242, released in March 1987 and re-released in 1992.

Track listing

Notes

The CD version of the original issue included 12" mixes of "Quite Unusual" and "Agressiva", giving the disc 11 tracks. The 1992 issue of the album added the first two songs from the "Masterhit" 12", bringing the track count to 13.

Reception

AllMusic's Ned Raggett rated the album 4 stars out of 5, describing it as "amazing" and "brutal", "helping to fully define industrial in the broadest sense of the term."

Personnel
 Daniel Bressanutti
 Patrick Codenys
 Jean-Luc De Meyer
 Richard Jonckheere
 F. Boebaert – art Direction
 Greg Calbi – remastering
 A. Verbaert, Front 242, L. Van Praet – photography

External links
Official Version at Discogs
"Quite Unusual" at Discogs
"Masterhit" at Discogs

References

1987 albums
Front 242 albums
Wax Trax! Records albums
Red Rhino Records albums
Epic Records albums